Andrea Martina Gesch (born 5 October 1973) is a German former rower. She competed in the women's eight event at the 1996 Summer Olympics.

References

External links
 

1973 births
Living people
German female rowers
Olympic rowers of Germany
Rowers at the 1996 Summer Olympics
People from Hennigsdorf
Sportspeople from Brandenburg